Un aller simple (One-way ticket) is a French film directed by Laurent Heynemann, adapted from the novel of the same name by Didier Van Cauwelaert, which had won the Prix Goncourt in 1994.

Plot
Aziz (Lorant Deutsch) was born in France, the child of unknown parents. Gathered up by gypsies from the area north of Marseille, he has grown up as a Moroccan national. Jean-Pierre (Jacques Villeret), is a civil servant in the Ministry of Foreign Affairs. He is being cheated on by his wife who is having an affair with his boss and he no longer feels attached to his Parisian life. It is given to Jean-Pierre to 're-integrate' Aziz, a stolen baby, raised  by gypsies, neither Arab nor gypsy, into his 'native' country of Morocco. Aziz is an interesting client for him.  But Aziz is just a young man without sure roots who has never set foot in Morocco, though he affects to belong to the tribe of the Grey Men of Irghiz who live in a forbidden city high in the Atlas Mountains.  And the two rootless men make the acquaintance of the sparkling Valerie (Barbara Schulz) who will act as  their guide.

Cast
Jacques Villeret as Jean-Pierre
Barbara Schulz as Valerie
Lorànt Deutsch as Aziz
Jean Benguigui as Place Vendôme
Eva Ionesco as Clémentine
Melissa Mars as Lila

References

External links

2001 films
2000s French-language films
2001 comedy-drama films
French comedy-drama films
Films about orphans
Films based on French novels
Films scored by Bruno Coulais
2000s French films